Agrotis ruta is a moth of the family Noctuidae first described by Eduard Friedrich Eversmann in 1851. It has a Holarctic distribution. In North America it has a northern distribution, occurring from Alaska and the Yukon Territory to Labrador, south to northern Manitoba and British Columbia, and in the Rocky Mountains to southern Alberta. Furthermore, it can be found in the northern Urals, Siberia, Mongolia, China and Japan.

Agrotis patula was placed in synonymy with Agrotis ruta by Kononenko et al. in 1989.

The wingspan is 40–46 mm.

External links

Agrotis
Moths of Asia
Moths of North America
Moths described in 1851